Australia was represented in table tennis at the 1960 Summer Paralympics.In the early Games, many Australian table tennis players represented Australia in several sports. It was won 8 medals - 2 gold, 3 silver and 3 bronze medals. 
Gold medallists are:
 Daphne Ceeney and Marion O'Brien in 1964
Terry Biggs in 1984
Lei Lina in 2021 (2020 Summer Paralympics) 
Qian Yang in 2021 (2020 Summer Paralympics)

Medal tally

Summer Paralympic Games

1960

Australia represented by: 
Men - Bruno Moretti, Bill Mather-Brown  
Australia won a silver medal in Men's Doubles B - Bruno Moretti, Bill Mather-Brown

1964

Australia represented by: 
Men - Allan McLucas 
Women - Daphne Ceeney, Marion O'Brien, Elaine Schreiber 
Australia won 1 gold and 3 bronze medals.

1968

Australia represented by:  
Men - Kevin Bawden, Alan Conn, Kevin Coombs, John Martin, Bill Mather-Brown, Allan McLucas, Bruno Moretti,  Jimmy Newton, Tony South, Don Watts 
Women - Lorraine Dodd, Daphne Hilton, Cherrie Loydstrom, Marion O'Brien, Elaine Schreiber, Pam Smith  
Australia won 1 silver medal in Women's Doubles C - Marion O'Brien, Elaine Schreiber.

1972

Australia represented by: 
Men – Bob Millan, Cliff Rickard 
Women - ?  
Australia did not win any medals.

1976

Australia represented by:
Men – Kevin Bawden, Wayne Flood, Ray Letheby, Peter Marsh, John Martin, Ross Soutar  
Women – Elaine Schreiber  
Australia did not win any medals.

1980

Australia represented by: 
Men – Donald Dann, Peter Marsh, John Martin, John Sheil, Charlie Tapscott   
Australia did not win any medals.

1984

Australia represented by: 
Men – Terry Biggs, Paul Croft, Garry Croker Joe Marlow, Errol Smith 

Women – Carmel Williams

Australian won a gold medal through Terry Biggs performance.

1988

Australia represented by: 
Men – Geoffrey Barden, Marcel Bucello, Paul Croft, Garry Croker,  Jeremy Halloran, Craig Parson, John Sheil, Ian Simpson 
Women – Carmel Williams 
Australia did not win any medals.

1992

 
Australia represented by: 
Men – Csaba Bobory  
Australia won no medals.

1996
No athletes

2000

Australia represented  by:

Men - Bill Medley, Ross Schurgott  
Officials - Head Coach - Joe Hoad (Head) ;  Officials - Carmel Medley 
Australia was given two wild card entries due to it being the host nation. It did not win any medals as no athlete progressed past the first round.

2004
No athletes

2008

Australia represented by:  Women - Rebecca Julian, Sarah Lazzaro 
Officials - Head Coach - Brian Berry, Section Manager - Barbara Talbot  Catherine Morrow was selected but withdrew from the team.

Australia did not win any medals.

2012

Australia represented by:  Women- Melissa Tapper, Rebecca McDonnell 
Officials - Head Coach - Alois Rosario ; Team Leader - Roger Massie     
Australia did not win any medals.

2016 

Australia represented by: 
Women- Daniela Di Toro, Melissa Tapper, Andrea McDonnell (d) 
Men-  Barak Mizrachi (d), Samuel Von Einem (d) 
Officials - Head Coach - Alois Rosario ; Team Leader - Roger Massie  

Sam Von Einem in winning the silver medal won Australia's first medal since Terry Biggs won gold in 1984.

(d)= Paralympic Games debut

See  also
Table tennis at the Summer Paralympics
Australia at the Paralympics

References

Australian Paralympic teams
Table tennis at the Summer Paralympics
Table tennis in Australia